Milad Jalai is an Iranian Football player who currently plays for Iranian football club  in the Iran Pro League.

Club career

Malavan
He started his career with Malavan youth team. He was promoted to first team by Nosrat Irandoost in summer of 2014. He made his debut for Malavan in 2014–15 Iran Pro League against Sepahan as a substitute for Mahyar Zahmatkesh.

Club career statistics

References

External links
 Milad Jalali at IranLeague.ir

1995 births
Living people
Iranian footballers
Malavan players
Association football defenders
People from Shiraz
Sportspeople from Fars province